The 1989–90 Santosh Trophy was the 43st edition of the Santosh Trophy, the main State competition for football in India. It was held in Margao, Goa. Goa defeated Kerala 2–0 in the final to win the competition for the third time. Kerala finished second for the third straight year.

Quarter-final

Pool A

Pool B

Semifinals

Final

References

External links 
 India 1990 at Rec.Sport.Soccer Statistics Foundation

Santosh Trophy seasons
1989–90 in Indian football